Marco Humberto Aguilar Coronado (born 25 March 1963) is a Mexican politician affiliated with the National Action Party. As of 2014 he served as Senator of the LX and LXI Legislatures of the Mexican Congress representing Puebla. He also served as Deputy between 1991 and 1994

References

1963 births
Living people
Politicians from Veracruz
Members of the Senate of the Republic (Mexico)
Members of the Chamber of Deputies (Mexico)
National Action Party (Mexico) politicians
21st-century Mexican politicians
20th-century Mexican politicians
Universidad Popular Autónoma del Estado de Puebla alumni
Academic staff of Universidad Popular Autónoma del Estado de Puebla
Members of the Congress of Puebla